One justice of the North Carolina Supreme Court and five judges of the North Carolina Court of Appeals were elected by North Carolina voters on November 2, 2010, on the same day as the U.S. Senate election, U.S. House elections, and other state-level elections. North Carolina judicial elections are non-partisan. Terms for seats on each court are eight years. All incumbent judges and justices who sought re-election won their respective races, except for Judge Cressie Thigpen of the Court of Appeals, who had been appointed shortly before the election and lost North Carolina's first statewide election to use Instant-runoff voting.

Supreme Court

Incumbent Edward Thomas Brady did not file to run for re-election. N.C. Court of Appeals Judges Robert C. Hunter  and Barbara Jackson filed to run for the open seat.

Court of Appeals (Calabria seat)

Incumbent Ann Marie Calabria  first announced that she would not seek re-election, but then reversed course and filed to run for another term. Judge Calabria had intended to run for re-election until her mother's health declined.  Then, her mother's health improved before the deadline to file as a candidate.  Other candidates who filed for the seat included state District Court Judge Jane P. Gray of Wake County and Superior Court Judge Mark E. Klass of Davidson County. Because more than two candidates filed for the seat, a primary election was held on May 4 to eliminate one candidate. Calabria won the primary with 37 percent, while Gray came in second with 36 percent of the vote. Klass, who took 26 percent, was eliminated. Calabria and Gray faced off in the general election.

Court of Appeals (Elmore seat)

Incumbent Rick Elmore filed to run for re-election. Attorney Leto Copeley of Orange County, law clerk and 2005 law school graduate Steven Walker, and attorney Alton D. (Al) Bain also filed. Because more than two candidates filed for the seat, a primary election was held on May 4. Walker was the highest vote getter in the primary with 38 percent, followed by Elmore with 28 percent. Copeley, with 18 percent, and Bain, with 14 percent, were eliminated from the race. Walker and Elmore faced off in the general election.

Court of Appeals (Geer seat)

Incumbent Martha A. Geer was opposed by appeals referee and adjunct law instructor Dean R. Poirier.

Court of Appeals (Steelman seat)

Incumbent Sanford L. Steelman, Jr. announced in 2009 that he would run for re-election to a second term. No candidates filed to oppose him.

Court of Appeals (Wynn seat)

When longtime Court of Appeals Judge James A. Wynn, Jr. was appointed and confirmed as a judge of the U.S. Court of Appeals for the Fourth Circuit, that triggered a special election for his seat. Under state law, because the vacancy in Wynn's seat occurred after the state's primary elections, the election employed instant runoff voting—the first time such a mechanism had been used in a statewide election in North Carolina. The law that allowed for instant runoff voting for judicial elections was eventually repealed in 2013.

Governor Perdue appointed Cressie Thigpen to fill the seat through the election. Thigpen then filed to run for the full eight-year term, as did twelve other candidates, including attorneys Chris Dillon, Anne Middleton, John Sullivan and Pamela Vesper, all of Raleigh; attorney J. Wesley Casteen of Wilmington; attorney Daniel Garner  of Wake Forest; attorneys John Bloss, Jewel Ann Farlow  (a 2008 candidate) and Stan Hammer, all of Greensboro; Superior Court Judge Mark E. Klass (who had previously run for the Calabria seat); former Court of Appeals Judge Douglas McCullough; and former North Carolina Commissioner of Labor Harry Payne.

IRV first round results

IRV second round results
Cressie Thigpen and Doug McCullough collected the most first-choice votes, while no candidate received fifty percent plus one vote. Therefore, the two advanced to the instant runoff, where second and third choices would be tallied to determine the winner. The State Board of Elections announced on Nov. 3 that it would be "at least a month" before the results would be known. Unofficial results were released in December, showing McCullough winning by about 6,000 votes. Thigpen called for a recount. The recount showed a slightly changed vote total, but the ultimate result was the same, and Thigpen conceded defeat.

See also
 North Carolina elections, 2010
 United States Senate election in North Carolina, 2010
 United States House of Representatives elections in North Carolina, 2010

Notes

References
State Board of Elections Candidate Filing List
State Board of Elections: General Election Results

External links
State Board of Elections: Voter Guides to the Statewide Judicial Elections
North Carolina judicial elections, 2010 at Judgepedia
Federalist Society NC Appellate Judicial Candidate Forum Video

judicial
2010